Liu Xiaomei may refer to:

Liu Xiaomei (athlete) (born 1972), Chinese sprinter
Liu Xiaomei (handballer) (born 1985), Chinese handball player